Fuerza Democrática can refer to:

 Democratic Force (Costa Rica)
 Democratic Force (Peru)